The 2013 British Academy Scotland Awards were held on 17 November 2013 at the Radisson Blu Hotel in Glasgow, honouring the best Scottish film and television productions of 2013.  Presented by BAFTA Scotland, accolades are handed out for the best in feature-length film that were screened at British cinemas during 2012. The Nominees were announced on 23 October 2014. The ceremony was broadcast online via YouTube and was hosted by Edith Bowman.

Richard Wilson, Kirsty Wark, Steve Begg and Rockstar North were honoured with Outstanding Contribution awards at this ceremony.

Winners and nominees

Winners are listed first and highlighted in boldface.

Outstanding Contribution to Film and Television
Richard Wilson

Outstanding Contribution to Craft (In Memory of Robert McCann)
Steve Begg

Outstanding Contribution to Broadcasting
Kirsty Wark

Special Award for 2013
Rockstar North

BAFTA Scotland Cineworld Audience Award
The Wee Man

See also
BAFTA Scotland
66th British Academy Film Awards
85th Academy Awards
19th Screen Actors Guild Awards
33rd Golden Raspberry Awards

References

External links
BAFTA Scotland Home page

2013
2013 in British cinema 
British
British
2013 in Scotland
2010s in Glasgow
BAF
Brit
November 2013 events in the United Kingdom